Albright is an unincorporated community in Middleville Township, Wright County, Minnesota, United States.  The community is located along Wright County Road 5 near 15th Street SW.  Nearby places include Howard Lake, Cokato, Albion Center, and Albright Mill County Park.  The North Fork of the Crow River flows nearby.

References

Unincorporated communities in Minnesota
Unincorporated communities in Wright County, Minnesota